The 1957–58 Soviet Championship League season was the 12th season of the Soviet Championship League, the top level of ice hockey in the Soviet Union. 16 teams participated in the league, and CSK MO Moscow won the championship for the fourth time in five years.

First round

Group A

Group B

Group C

Group D

Final round

Relegation

External links
Season on hockeystars.ru

Soviet
Soviet League seasons
1957–58 in Soviet ice hockey